Tom Ward is a Canadian male curler and coach.

Record as a coach of national teams

References

External links

Living people
Canadian male curlers
Canadian curling coaches
Year of birth missing (living people)